The NWA International Junior Heavyweight Championship started in 1979. It was formed by a split in lineage from the NWA World Junior Heavyweight Championship caused by the retirement of champion Nelson Royal the same year. The first champion, Steve Keirn, was recognized as world champion only by Florida, Los Angeles, and New Japan Pro-Wrestling. This version was eventually taken to the latter promotion by Tatsumi Fujinami, who already held the WWF Junior Heavyweight Championship.

In 1981, champion Chavo Guerrero left NJPW to go back to the United States, only to come back to Japan under the banner of All Japan Pro Wrestling, where a year later, it was renamed the International Junior Heavyweight Championship to avoid confusion and (along with being given a new belt design) in general line with AJPW's NWA titles. The championship became the cornerstone of AJPW's junior heavyweight division until its eventual replacement by the World Junior Heavyweight Championship, which kept the belt design until 2017.

In March 2007, after over two decades of inactivity, Toryumon Mexico reactivated the championship, using the belt that was used prior to November 1982.

Title history

Footnotes

See also

List of National Wrestling Alliance championships
NWA World Junior Heavyweight Championship
International Junior Heavyweight Championship (Zero1)
NWA World Junior Heavyweight Championship (Zero1)
Zero1 USA World Junior Heavyweight Championship
NWA X Championship
WCW Cruiserweight Championship
WWA International Cruiserweight Championship
NWA World Junior Heavyweight Championship (Los Angeles version)

References

External links
NWA International Junior Heavyweight Title History

Junior heavyweight wrestling championships
All Japan Pro Wrestling championships
New Japan Pro-Wrestling championships
Toryumon championships
International professional wrestling championships